The Chile women's national under-18 and under-19 basketball team is a national basketball team of Chile, administered by the Federación de Basquetbol de Chile.

It represents the country in international under-18 and under-19 (under age 18 and under age 19) women's basketball competitions.

See also
Chile women's national basketball team
Chile women's national under-17 basketball team
Chile men's national under-19 basketball team

References

External links
 Archived records of Chile team participations

under
Women's national under-19 basketball teams